Fawaz Ismail Johar (born 16 October 1976) is a Bahraini hurdler. He competed in the men's 110 metres hurdles at the 1996 Summer Olympics.

References

1976 births
Living people
Athletes (track and field) at the 1996 Summer Olympics
Bahraini male hurdlers
Olympic athletes of Bahrain
Place of birth missing (living people)